The 2002 MAAC Men's Ice Hockey Tournament was the 4th championship in the history of the conference. It was played between March 9 and March 16, 2002. Quarterfinal games were played at home team campus sites, while the final four games were played at the Hart Center in Worcester, Massachusetts, the home venue of the Holy Cross Crusaders. By winning the tournament Quinnipiac received MAAC's automatic bid to the 2002 NCAA Men's Division I Ice Hockey Tournament, their first appearance in the tournament.

Format
The tournament featured three rounds of play with each round being single-elimination. The teams that finish below eighth in the standings are ineligible for tournament play. In the first round, the first and eighth seeds, the second and seventh seeds, the third seed and sixth seeds, and the fourth seed and fifth seeds played with the winner advancing to the semifinals. In the semifinals, the highest and lowest seeds and second highest and second lowest seeds play with the winner advancing to the championship game.  The tournament champion receives an automatic bid to the 2002 NCAA Men's Division I Ice Hockey Tournament.

Conference standings
Note: GP = Games played; W = Wins; L = Losses; T = Ties; PTS = Points; GF = Goals For; GA = Goals Against

Bracket

Teams are reseeded after the quarterfinals

Note: * denotes overtime period(s)

Quarterfinals

(1) Mercyhurst vs. (8) Army

(2) Quinnipiac vs. (7) Iona

(3) Holy Cross vs. (6) Connecticut

(4) Sacred Heart vs. (5) Canisius

Semifinals

(1) Mercyhurst vs. (6) Connecticut

(2) Quinnipiac vs. (4) Sacred Heart

Championship

(1) Mercyhurst vs. (2) Quinnipiac

Tournament awards

All-Tournament Team
F Matt Craig* (Quinnipiac)
F Chris White (Quinnipiac)
F Louis Goulet (Mercyhurst)
D Matt Erhart (Quinnipiac)
D Mike Muldoon (Mercyhurst)
G Jamie Holden (Quinnipiac)
* Most Valuable Player(s)

References

MAAC Men's Ice Hockey Tournament
MAAC Men's Ice Hockey Tournament
MAAC Men's Ice Hockey